The 2019 Korea Masters (officially known as the Gwangju Korea Masters 2019) was a badminton tournament which took place at Gwangju Women’s University Stadium in Gwangju, South Korea, from 19 to 24 November 2019 and had a total prize of $200,000.

Tournament
The 2019 Korea Masters was the twenty-fifth tournament of the 2019 BWF World Tour and also part of the Korea Masters championships, which has been held since 2007. This was the last tournament to be counted in the 2019 BWF World Tour Finals rank. This tournament was organized by Badminton Korea Association and sanctioned by the BWF.

Venue
This international tournament was held at Gwangju Women’s University Stadium in Gwangju, South Korea.

Point distribution
Below is the point distribution table for each phase of the tournament based on the BWF points system for the BWF World Tour Super 300 event.

Prize money
The total prize money for this tournament was US$200,000. Distribution of prize money was in accordance with BWF regulations.

Men's singles

Seeds

 Shi Yuqi (withdrew)
 Chen Long (withdrew)
 Anders Antonsen (withdrew)
 Viktor Axelsen (withdrew)
 Ng Ka Long (second round)
 Srikanth Kidambi (second round)
 Kantaphon Wangcharoen (second round)
 Kenta Nishimoto (second round)

Finals

Top half

Section 1

Section 2

Bottom half

Section 3

Section 4

Women's singles

Seeds

 Akane Yamaguchi (semifinals)
 He Bingjiao (second round)
 Saina Nehwal (withdrew)
 Sayaka Takahashi (first round)
 Sung Ji-hyun (final)
 Han Yue (withdrew)
 An Se-young (champion)
 Carolina Marín (withdrew)

Finals

Top half

Section 1

Section 2

Bottom half

Section 3

Section 4

Men's doubles

Seeds

 Li Junhui / Liu Yuchen (withdrew) 
 Takeshi Kamura / Keigo Sonoda (withdrew) 
 Hiroyuki Endo / Yuta Watanabe (withdrew) 
 Han Chengkai / Zhou Haodong (first round)
 Kim Astrup / Anders Skaarup Rasmussen (first round)
 Lee Yang / Wang Chi-lin (champions)
 Goh V Shem / Tan Wee Kiong (final)
 Choi Sol-gyu / Seo Seung-jae (semi-finals)

Finals

Top half

Section 1

Section 2

Bottom half

Section 3

Section 4

Women's doubles

Seeds

 Mayu Matsumoto / Wakana Nagahara (withdrew)
 Chen Qingchen / Jia Yifan (withdrew)
 Yuki Fukushima / Sayaka Hirota (withdrew)
 Misaki Matsutomo / Ayaka Takahashi (final)
 Lee So-hee / Shin Seung-chan (semi-finals)
 Du Yue / Li Yinhui (withdrew)
 Kim So-yeong / Kong Hee-yong (second round)
 Jongkolphan Kititharakul / Rawinda Prajongjai (withdrew)

Finals

Top half

Section 1

Section 2

Bottom half

Section 3

Section 4

Mixed doubles

Seeds

 Yuta Watanabe / Arisa Higashino (withdrew)
 Dechapol Puavaranukroh / Sapsiree Taerattanachai (withdrew)
 Seo Seung-jae / Chae Yoo-jung (quarter-finals)
 Chan Peng Soon / Goh Liu Ying (quarter-finals)
 Tang Chun Man / Tse Ying Suet (champions)
 Goh Soon Huat / Shevon Jemie Lai (final)
 He Jiting / Du Yue (withdrew)
 Tan Kian Meng / Lai Pei Jing (second round)

Finals

Top half

Section 1

Section 2

Bottom half

Section 3

Section 4

References

External links
 Tournament Link

Korea Masters
Korea Masters
Korea Masters
Korea Masters